Days + Nights is the debut studio album by British recording artist Daley. It was released on 11 February 2014 by Polydor Records in the United Kingdom and Republic Records in the United States.

Critical reception 

Days + Nights received generally mixed reviews from music critics. Allmusic editor Andy Kellman found the album "brilliantly put together" and declared it "one of 2014's best debuts." He noted that "that album courses through many moods and modes, yet it's impressively unified." Financial Times journalist Ludovic Hunter-Tilney found that Daley "picked up several influential accomplices along the way, including Pharrell Williams who has produced the seductive “Look Up”, a highlight among the sophisticated but too restrained songs on display here. MOBO editor Adenike Gboyega wrote that "on Days + Nights, Daley flips the script and offers a heartfelt, soulful album that shows he is a serious and lasting performer." He noted that "this album has the sound of an artist who is beginning to go places. And thats a good sound to hear in the hands of one so obviously gifted in music and song."

Samantha Kennedy from Vibe called Days + Nights a "courageously emo album." She felt that "Daley truly takes you into his own life experiences with this album, tearing his heart open and letting it bleed [...] After listening, you find his jam-packed LP is truly one-size-fits-all."  Rachael McArthur, writing for Renowned for Sound, commented that the album "is a bit of a mixed bag in my opinion and one shouldn’t go into it with high expectations. With the exception of a few notable tracks within the record, the rest of the album is fair in its delivery. Not a bad effort though I don’t imagine this effort to be featured on any “Best of 2014” album lists." Ross Horton, writing for online music magazine MusicOMH, called the album "a Frankenstein's monster of a record, cobbled together from EPs and singles that have appeared over the past two years." Citing "the music itself as one of the biggest problems with Days & Nights," he found that "Daley, throughout, provides a dextrous and varied vocal approach. His sultry soul emotion reveals his Bee Gees head voice in all its dramatic splendor."

Commercial performance
The album debuted and peaked at number 128 on the US Billboard 200 and number 21 on the Top R&B/Hip-Hop Albums.

Track listing 
Credits adapted from the liner notes of Days & Nights.

Notes
 signifies an additional producer

Charts

References

External links 
 

2014 debut albums
Albums produced by Pharrell Williams
Albums produced by Bernard Butler
Albums produced by Illangelo
Daley (musician) albums
Electronic albums by English artists